The 2005 Kansas City Wizards season was the 10th season for both the club and the league altogether. 2005 marked the entrance of two new clubs, Real Salt Lake and Chivas USA, increasing the league to 12 teams; as a result of these Western additions, the Wizards moved to the Eastern Conference.

In the East, Kansas City attained 45 points (11W 9L 12D), finishing fifth in the East and 12th overall and missing the postseason by two points behind MetroStars. The 2005 season was the first time since 1999 the Wizards did not participate in MLS' large-scale postseason, and Kansas City joined the Western expansion teams and the Columbus Crew as the only teams to not qualify for the 2005 playoffs. In addition, attendance at Arrowhead Stadium, which was higher than most MLS teams at the time despite playing in a large cavernous NFL stadium, dipped below 10,000 after a few years of increases.

Despite these developments, two Kansas City players earned honors. Newly blooded U.S. national team member Jimmy Conrad was named Defender of the Year, and Wizards stalwart Chris Klein recovered from a torn ACL sustained in the prior season to become Comeback Player of the Year.

Squad

Competitions

Major League Soccer

U.S. Open Cup

CONCACAF Champions' Cup

Final Squad statistics

References

Kansas City
Sporting Kansas City seasons
Kansas City Wizards
Kansas City Wizards